Janine Alder (born 5 July 1995) is a Swiss ice hockey goaltender and member of the Swiss national ice hockey team, currently playing with the Thurgau Ladies of the Swiss Women's League. She has represented Switzerland at many international tournaments, including at the Winter Olympics in 2014 and 2018. At the 2014 Games, she won the bronze medal after Switzerland defeated  in the bronze medal game.

Alder played four years of college ice hockey with the St. Cloud State Huskies women's ice hockey program in the Western Collegiate Hockey Association (WCHA) conference of the NCAA Division I.

References

External links
 
 
 

1995 births
Living people
Ice hockey players at the 2014 Winter Olympics
Ice hockey players at the 2018 Winter Olympics
Medalists at the 2014 Winter Olympics
Olympic ice hockey players of Switzerland
Olympic bronze medalists for Switzerland
Olympic medalists in ice hockey
People from Appenzell Ausserrhoden
Swiss women's ice hockey goaltenders
St. Cloud State Huskies women's ice hockey players
Swiss expatriate ice hockey people
Swiss expatriate sportspeople in the United States